East Hampton or its variants may refer to:

Places in the United States
East Hampton, Connecticut, a New England town
East Hampton (CDP), Connecticut, the central village in the town
Easthampton, Massachusetts, a city
Eastampton Township, New Jersey
East Hampton (town), New York
East Hampton (village), New York, in the town of East Hampton

Other uses
Easthampton, Herefordshire, England
, a United States Navy patrol vessel from 1917 to 1919

See also
Hampton East, Victoria
Hampton (disambiguation)